José Carlos Montoyo Díaz (born October 17, 1965) is a Puerto Rican former professional baseball second baseman and coach. He is currently the bench coach of the Chicago White Sox, and was previously the manager of the Toronto Blue Jays of Major League Baseball (MLB).

After eight seasons as manager of the minor league Durham Bulls, the  Triple-A affiliate of the Tampa Bay Rays (–), Montoyo was among the candidates for the Rays'  vacant managerial position and was ultimately hired as the team's third base coach. After the  season, he became the Rays’ bench coach. On October 25, 2018, Montoyo was hired by the Toronto Blue Jays as their new manager, replacing John Gibbons. On July 13, 2022 Montoyo was fired by the Blue Jays. On November 3, 2022, Montoyo was named bench coach of the Chicago White Sox.

Playing career
Montoyo threw and batted right-handed. Montoyo appeared in four games for the Montreal Expos, during the  season, as a second baseman and pinch hitter.

After playing college baseball at Louisiana Tech University, Montoyo was drafted by the Milwaukee Brewers in the sixth round of the 1987 amateur draft, and then traded to Montreal on January 20, 1993. During his brief MLB career, that September, he singled in his first big-league at bat off Gary Wayne of the Colorado Rockies. All told, Montoyo had two hits in five at bats, with three runs batted in (RBI).

Montoyo played in 1,028 minor league games and retired at the end of the  season. In ten years in the minors, he batted .266, with 38 home runs, and 400 RBI.

Managing career

Tampa Bay organization
In 1997, Montoyo joined the Tampa Bay Devil Rays' organization – the year before the expansion team played its first Major League game – as manager of the Rookie-level Princeton Devil Rays.

After leading Princeton to a 39–30 win–loss record in 1997, Montoyo managed the 1998 Short Season-A Hudson Valley Renegades, where he won his first division title. In 1999–2000, he managed the Charleston RiverDogs, leading them to their first winning season. He then was the pilot of the Bakersfield Blaze of the High Class A California League in 2001–2002. For the next four years, he served as the manager of Tampa Bay's Double-A clubs, the Orlando Rays (2003) and Montgomery Biscuits (2004–2006), where he won the Southern League championship in 2006.

In 2007, Montoyo became manager of Tampa Bay's top farm team, the Durham Bulls.  Under his leadership, Durham had only one losing season and exceeded 80 wins five times in his first seven years. In 2010, the Bulls set a franchise Triple-A record for wins with 92.  In both 2009 and 2013, they won the Governors' Cup, emblematic of the championship of the International League.  Through 2015, his career minor-league managing record was 1,341–1,211 (.525).

Montoyo was a coach for the Puerto Rican 2009 World Baseball Classic team. Also, he was selected to serve as a coach for World Team in the 2010 and 2011 All-Star Futures Game.

He won the 2009 Mike Coolbaugh Award and 2010 and 2013 International League Manager of the Year Award.

On July 21, 2014, Montoyo surpassed Bill Evers as the Bulls' all-time winningest manager with his 614th victory at the helm of the Rays' Triple-A affiliate.  At the time of his promotion to the Rays, Montoyo had notched 633 wins in a Bulls' uniform.

On October 19, 2015, Montoyo interviewed for the Seattle Mariners vacant managerial position.

On October 24, 2015, the Rays hired Matt Quatraro as their new third base coach and Montoyo became the bench coach, replacing Tom Foley.

Toronto Blue Jays
On October 25, 2018, Montoyo was hired as the manager of the Toronto Blue Jays for the 2019 season. He signed a three-year contract, with a club option for a fourth year. He finished his first season with a record of 67 wins and 95 losses.

After guiding the Blue Jays to the playoffs in the 2020 season, Montoyo was nominated for AL Manager of the Year award along with Kevin Cash of the Tampa Bay Rays and Rick Renteria of the Chicago White Sox.

On March 16, 2021, the Blue Jays exercised the fourth-year option on Montoyo's contract, tying him to the team through the 2022 season. On April 1, 2022, Montoyo signed a contract extension through the 2023 season, and included team options for 2024 and 2025. Montoyo was fired on July 13 after a 2–9 stretch, despite the team sitting in the third wild card spot.

Chicago White Sox

On November 3, 2022, Montoyo was named the bench coach of the Chicago White Sox under new manager Pedro Grifol.

Managerial record

Championships
Montgomery Biscuits
 Southern League (2006)

Durham Bulls
 6 Division Championships (2007, 2008, 2009, 2010, 2011, and 2013)
 2 International League Championship (2009 and 2013)
The Bulls were Runners-up to the then-Richmond Braves, Scranton/Wilkes-Barre, and Columbus Clippers in 2007, 2008, and 2010 respectively
 Triple-A Baseball National Championship (2009)

Personal life
Montoyo has a wife, Samantha, with whom he has two children.

See also
 List of Major League Baseball players from Puerto Rico

References

External links

1965 births
Living people
Beloit Brewers players
Denver Zephyrs players
Durham Bulls managers
El Paso Diablos players
Harrisburg Senators players
Helena Brewers players
Louisiana Tech Bulldogs baseball players
Major League Baseball players from Puerto Rico
Major League Baseball second basemen
Major League Baseball third base coaches
Montreal Expos players
Ottawa Lynx players
Puerto Rican expatriate baseball players in Canada
People from Florida, Puerto Rico
Scranton/Wilkes-Barre Red Barons players
Stockton Ports players
Tampa Bay Rays coaches
Toronto Blue Jays managers